The Party of Culture, Education and Labour (CET), also sometimes simply known as the CET Party is a minor peronist and labourist political party in Argentina founded in 2013 by teamsters' union leader and former Secretary General of the CGT, Hugo Moyano. The party is closely allied with the Justicialist Party, and presently forms part of the Frente de Todos, the ruling coalition supporting President Alberto Fernández.

It presently counts with minimal representation at the federal level, with Hugo Moyano's son, Facundo Moyano, serving in the Argentine Chamber of Deputies since 2011 (and having been a member of CET since its foundation in 2013). Up until 2019, Jorge Taboada, a member of the party, was National Deputy representing Chubut Province.

Electoral performance

President

Chamber of Deputies

See also
Trade unions in Argentina
General Confederation of Labour (Argentina)

References

Political parties established in 2013
2013 establishments in Argentina
Peronist parties and alliances in Argentina